In mathematics, in the field of topology, a topological space is said to be hemicompact if it has a sequence of compact subsets such that every compact subset of the space lies inside some compact set in the sequence. Clearly, this forces the union of the sequence to be the whole space, because every point is compact and hence must lie in one of the compact sets.

Examples
 Every compact space is hemicompact.
 The real line is hemicompact.
 Every locally compact Lindelöf space is hemicompact.

Properties
Every hemicompact space is σ-compact and if in addition it is first countable then it is locally compact.

Applications
If  is a hemicompact space, then the space  of all continuous functions  to a metric space  with the compact-open topology is metrizable. To see this, take a sequence  of compact subsets of  such that every compact subset of  lies inside some compact set in this sequence (the existence of such a sequence follows from the hemicompactness of ). Define pseudometrics

Then

See also
 Compact space
 Locally compact space
 Lindelöf space

Notes

References

Compactness (mathematics)
Properties of topological spaces